The Adecco Cup, also known as the Adecco Ex-Yu Cup in 2011 and 2012, is an international basketball friendly competition. The tournament is sponsored by Adecco and is played under FIBA rules.

History

Participation details

See also 
 Acropolis Tournament
 Basketball at the Summer Olympics
 FIBA Basketball World Cup
 FIBA Asia Cup
 FIBA Diamond Ball
 Marchand Continental Championship Cup
 Belgrade Trophy
 Stanković Cup
 William Jones Cup

References

External links
2011 Stats at Slovenian Basketball Federation website

 
Basketball competitions in Europe between national teams
Basketball competitions in Bosnia and Herzegovina
Basketball competitions in Croatia
Basketball competitions in North Macedonia
Basketball competitions in Montenegro
Basketball cup competitions in Serbia
Basketball competitions in Slovenia
Recurring sporting events established in 2009